Aaron of Pinsk, also Aharon Kretinger, was a rabbi in Kretinga, in the Kovno Governorate, and afterward in Pinsk, where he died in 1841. He wrote Tosafot Aharon, in which he attempted to solve the questions of the Tosafists in various Talmudic treatises, notably in Zera'im, Mo'ed, and Niddah. The book, which contains also scholastic and cabalistic discourses, was printed in 1858.

References

19th-century Belarusian people
Year of birth unknown
1841 deaths
Belarusian rabbis
Authors of works on the Talmud
Authors of Kabbalistic works
Clergy from Pinsk